It Feels So Good is the eighth studio album by American vocal group, The Manhattans, released in 1977 through Columbia Records. This album has been Certified Gold by the R.I.A.A.

Reception
The album peaked at No. 12 on the R&B albums chart. It also reached No. 68 on the Billboard 200. The album features the singles "I Kinda Miss You", which peaked at No. 7 on the Hot Soul Singles chart and No. 46 on the Billboard Hot 100, "It Feels So Good to Be Loved So Bad", which charted at No. 6 on the Hot Soul Singles chart and No. 66 on the Billboard Hot 100, and "We Never Danced to a Love Song", which reached No. 10 on the Hot Soul Singles chart and No. 93 on the Billboard Hot 100.

Track listing

Charts 
Album

Singles

References

External links 
 

1977 albums
The Manhattans albums
Albums produced by Bobby Martin
Albums arranged by Bobby Martin
Columbia Records albums
Albums recorded at Total Experience Recording Studios